A particulate air filter is a device composed of fibrous, or porous materials which removes solid particulates such as dust, pollen, mold, and bacteria from the air. Filters containing an adsorbent or catalyst such as charcoal (carbon) may also remove odors and gaseous pollutants such as volatile organic compounds or ozone. Air filters are used in applications where air quality is important, notably in building ventilation systems and in engines.

Some buildings, as well as aircraft and other human-made environments (e.g., satellites, and Space Shuttles) use foam, pleated paper, or spun fiberglass filter elements. Another method, air ionizers, use fibers or elements with a static electric charge, which attract dust particles. The air intakes of internal combustion engines and air compressors tend to use either paper, foam, or cotton filters. Oil bath filters have fallen out of favour aside from niche uses. The technology of air intake filters of gas turbines has improved significantly in recent years, due to improvements in the aerodynamics and fluid dynamics of the air-compressor part of the gas turbines.

HEPA filters 

High efficiency particulate arrester (HEPA), originally called high-efficiency particulate absorber but also sometimes called high-efficiency particulate arresting or high-efficiency particulate arrestance, is a type of air filter. Filters meeting the HEPA standard have many applications, including use in clean rooms for IC fabrication, medical facilities, automobiles, aircraft and homes. The filter must satisfy certain standards of efficiency such as those set by the United States Department of Energy (DOE).

Varying standards define what qualifies as a HEPA filter. The two most common standards require that an air filter must remove (from the air that passes through) 99.95% (European Standard) or 99.97% (ASME standard) of particles that have a size greater than or equal to 0.3 μm.

Automotive cabin air filters 
The cabin air filter is typically a pleated-paper filter that is placed in the outside-air intake for the vehicle's passenger compartment. Some of these filters are rectangular and similar in shape to the engine air filter. Others are uniquely shaped to fit the available space of particular vehicles' outside-air intakes.

The first automaker to include a disposable filter to keep the ventilation system clean was the Nash Motors "Weather Eye", introduced in 1940.

A reusable heater core filter was available as an optional accessory on Studebaker models beginning in 1959, including Studebaker Lark automobiles (1959-1966), Studebaker Gran Turismo Hawk automobiles (1962-1964) and Studebaker Champ trucks (1960-1964).  The filter was an aluminum frame containing an aluminum mesh and was located directly above the heater core. The filter was removed and installed from the engine compartment through a slot in the firewall.  A long, thin rubber seal plugged the slot when the filter was installed.  The filter could be vacuumed and washed prior to installation.

Clogged or dirty cabin air filters can significantly reduce airflow from the cabin vents, as well as introduce allergens into the cabin air stream. Since the cabin air temperature depends upon the flow rate of the air passing through the heater core, the evaporator, or both, clogged filters can greatly reduce the effectiveness and performance of the vehicle's air conditioning and heating systems.

Some cabin air filters perform poorly, and some cabin air filter manufacturers do not print a minimum efficiency reporting value (MERV) filter rating on their cabin air filters.

Internal combustion engine air filters 

The combustion air filter prevents abrasive particulate matter from entering the engine's cylinders, where it would cause mechanical wear and oil contamination.

Most fuel injected vehicles use a pleated paper filter element in the form of a flat panel. This filter is usually placed inside a plastic box connected to the throttle body with duct work. This is positioned above or beside the carburetor or throttle body, usually in a metal or plastic container which may incorporate ducting to provide cool and/or warm inlet air, and secured with a metal or plastic lid. The overall unit (filter and housing together) is called the air cleaner.

Paper 

Pleated paper filter elements are the nearly exclusive choice for automobile engine air cleaners, because they are efficient, easy to service, and cost-effective. The "paper" term is somewhat misleading, as the filter media are considerably different from papers used for writing or packaging, etc. There is a persistent belief among tuners, fomented by advertising for aftermarket non-paper replacement filters, that paper filters flow poorly and thus restrict engine performance. In fact, as long as a pleated-paper filter is sized appropriately for the airflow volumes encountered in a particular application, such filters present only trivial restriction to flow until the filter has  become significantly clogged with dirt. Construction equipment engines also use this. The reason is that the paper is bent in zig-zag shape, and the total area of the paper is very large, in the range of 50 times of the air opening.

Foam 
Oil-wetted polyurethane foam elements are used in some aftermarket replacement automobile air filters. Foam was in the past widely used in air cleaners on small engines on lawnmowers and other power equipment, but automotive-type paper filter elements have largely supplanted oil-wetted foam in these applications. Depending on the grade and thickness of foam employed, an oil-wetted foam filter element can offer minimal airflow restriction or very high dirt capacity, the latter property making foam filters a popular choice in off-road rallying and other motorsport applications where high levels of dust will be encountered. Due to the way dust is captured on foam filters, large amounts may be trapped without measurable change in airflow restriction.

Cotton 
Oiled cotton gauze is employed in a growing number of aftermarket automotive air filters marketed as high-performance items. In the past, cotton gauze saw limited use in original-equipment automotive air filters. However, since the introduction of the Abarth SS versions, the Fiat subsidiary supplies cotton gauze air filters as OE filters.

Stainless steel
Stainless steel mesh is another example of medium which allow more air to pass through. 
Stainless steel mesh comes with different mesh counts, offering different filtration standards. 
In an extreme modified engine lacking in space for a cone based air filter, some will opt to install a simple stainless steel mesh over the turbo to ensure no particles enter the engine via the turbo.

Oil bath 
An oil bath air cleaner consists of a sump containing a pool of oil, and an insert which is filled with fiber, mesh, foam, or another coarse filter media. The cleaner removes particles by adhering them to the oil-soaked filter media rather than traditional filtration, the openings in the filter media are much larger than the particles that are to be filtered. When the cleaner is assembled, the media-containing body of the insert sits a short distance above the surface of the oil pool. The rim of the insert overlaps the rim of the sump. This arrangement forms a labyrinthine path through which the air must travel in a series of U-turns: up through the gap between the rims of the insert and the sump, down through the gap between the outer wall of the insert and the inner wall of the sump, and up through the filter media in the body of the insert. This U-turn takes the air at high velocity across the surface of the oil pool. Larger and heavier dust and dirt particles in the air cannot make the turn due to their inertia, so they fall into the oil and settle to the bottom of the base bowl. Lighter and smaller particles stick to the filtration media in the insert, which is wetted by oil droplets aspirated there into by normal airflow. The constant aspiration of oil onto the filter media slowly carries most of the finer trapped particles downward and the oil drips back into the reservoir where the particles accumulate.
  
Oil bath air cleaners were very widely used in automotive and small engine applications until the widespread industry adoption of the paper filter in the early 1960s. Such cleaners are still used in off-road equipment where very high levels of dust are encountered, for oil bath air cleaners can sequester a great deal of dirt relative to their overall size without loss of filtration efficiency or airflow. However, the liquid oil makes cleaning and servicing such air cleaners messy and inconvenient, they must be relatively large to avoid excessive restriction at high airflow rates, and they tend to increase exhaust emissions of unburned hydrocarbons due to oil aspiration when used on spark-ignition engines.

Water bath 
In the early 20th century (about 1900 to 1930), water bath air cleaners were used in some applications (cars, trucks, tractors, and portable and stationary engines). They worked on roughly the same principles as oil bath air cleaners. For example, the original Fordson tractor had a water bath air cleaner. By the 1940s, oil bath designs had displaced water bath designs because of better filtering performance.

Bulk solids handling filters 

Bulk solids handling involves the transport of solids (mechanical transport, pneumatic transport) which may be in a powder form. Many industries are handling bulk solids (mining industries, chemical industries, food industries) which requires the treatment of air streams escaping the process so that fine particles are not emitted, for regulatory reasons or economical reasons (loss of materials). As a consequence, air filters are positioned at many places in the process, especially at the reception of pneumatic conveying lines where the quantity of air is important and the load in fine particle quite important. Filters can also be placed at any point of air exchange in the process to avoid that pollutants enter the process, which is particularly true in pharmaceuticals and food industries. The physical phenomena involved in catching particles with a filter are mainly inertial and diffusional

Filter classes 

Under European normalization standards EN 779, the following filter classes were recognized:

European standard EN 779, on which the above table is based, remained in effect from 2012 to mid-2018, when it was replaced by ISO 16890.

See also 
Air purifier
 Clean Air Delivery Rate
 Cyclonic separation
 Diesel particulate filter
 Dust collector
 Corsi–Rosenthal Box
 Impingement filter
 Mechanical filter (respirator)#Filtration standards
 Nose filter
 Oil filter
 Respirator
 Scrubber
 Smog tower
 Swan neck duct

References

External links

Auto parts
Air filters
Particulate control
Engine components
Gas technologies
Solid-gas separation

ja:エアクリーナー